Pilosella lactucella (synonym Hieracium lactucella, also called European hawkweed) is a species of perennial plant from the family Asteraceae, found in Europe, New York (United States) and Nova Scotia (Canada). It was once described by Carl Linnaeus as Hieracium auricula and Pilosella auricula, but was recategorized by A. E. Roland and M. Zinck in 1998.

References

External links

lactucella
Flora of Europe
Plants described in 1822